Politicking with Larry King is an American weekly political talk show hosted by Larry King which premiered on June 13, 2013. The guests of the show included various political figures and world leaders. The series is available on Ora TV, Hulu and RT America. The show is distributed worldwide by RT America and Ora TV; the latter also produced another show hosted by King from 2013 to 2020, Larry King Now, which focused on interviews with celebrity guests. The show ran from 2013 to 2020.

The show received criticism due to the fact that it airs on the RT America network, which has frequently been described as "pro-Russian", with allegations that it has been used as a "Kremlin's propaganda tool". King addressed such claims by saying: "I don't work for RT. It's a deal made between the companies. They just license our shows," and also adding that "to [his] knowledge" the network has never altered any interviews that he has done, "If they took something out, I would never do it.  It would be bad if they tried to edit out things. I wouldn’t put up with it."

A number of guest hosts stood in for Larry King such as Matthew Cooke.

References

External links
 Politicking with Larry King on Ora TV

English-language television shows
2013 American television series debuts
2020 American television series endings
2010s American television talk shows
2020s American television talk shows
American non-fiction web series
Web talk shows
RT (TV network) original programming